Bristol Ferry Light is a historic lighthouse in Bristol, Rhode Island, United States.  It is located on the shores of Narragansett Bay at Bristol Point, the northern land point of Mount Hope Bay at the base of the Mount Hope Bridge.

The two-story square brick lighthouse was built in 1855, along with an attached  story brick keeper's house.  Its use was discontinued in 1927 with the construction of the Mount Hope Bridge, and a replacement automated beacon across Ferry Road. Prior to the construction of the bridge, a ferry operated between Bristol and Aquidneck Island, and the light assisted the ferry service. The Bristol Ferry Lighthouse was added to the National Register of Historic Places in 1988, at which time it was a private residence.

See also 
National Register of Historic Places listings in Bristol County, Rhode Island

References

External links
 
 Lighthouse info site
 National Register site link
1855 Plans for Bristol Ferry Lighthouse

1855 establishments in Rhode Island
Buildings and structures in Bristol, Rhode Island
Lighthouses completed in 1855
Lighthouses on the National Register of Historic Places in Rhode Island
Narragansett Bay
National Register of Historic Places in Bristol County, Rhode Island
Tourist attractions in Bristol County, Rhode Island
Transportation buildings and structures in Bristol County, Rhode Island